Heiner Geißler (3 March 1930 – 12 September 2017) was a German politician with the Christian Democratic Union (CDU) party and a federal minister from 1982 to 1985.

Career 
Born Heinrichjosef Georg Geißler in Gleisweiler, he studied law and philosophy in Munich and Tübingen, where he graduated in 1960.

From 1967 to June 1977, Geißler was minister of the state government of Rhineland-Palatine, serving prime ministers Peter Altmeier, Helmut Kohl and Bernhard Vogel. During that time, he implemented the first law concerning kindergartens, and introduced the state's first welfare stations.

From 1982 to 1985 Geißler served as federal minister, heading the Bundesministerium für Jugend, Familie und Gesundheit (youth, family, and health) for Chancellor Kohl. It was during this period that said federal ministry was alerted to the Austrian wine scandal in 1985.

From 1977 to 1989, Geißler was Secretary General of the CDU under the leadership of Kohl, shaping strategy and running election campaigns. He was widely regarded as a principal architect of Kohl's rise to the chancellorship in 1982.  In the following years, he kept the party on a centrist track, hoping to attract moderate voters among the opposition Social Democrats alarmed by the gains of the Republicans and the environmentalist Green Party.

Despite becoming a major figure in the CDU, differing and increasingly left-leaning views eventually strained relations with Kohl. Reports that Geißler would be replaced cropped up after the Christian Democrats lost elections in West Berlin and Frankfurt in 1989 and polled only 37.6 percent in the European elections that year, a drop of 8.2 percentage points from the 1984 elections. In late 1989, he joined forces with Kurt Biedenkopf, Lothar Späth, Rita Süssmuth and others in an unsuccessful effort to oust Kohl as CDU chairman. Geißler was subsequently forced to resign as secretary general.

Geißler remained a member of the Bundestag until 2002 as a member of parliament for his home state Rhineland-Palatinate. From 1991 until 1998, he served as deputy chairman of the CDU/CSU parliamentary group under the leadership of chairman Wolfgang Schäuble.

In addition to his parliamentary work, Geißler also served as Vice-President of the Christian Democrat and People's Parties International from 1986 until 1993.

Geißler later became a sought-after arbitrator in wage and other disputes.

Political positions 
During the 1991 parliamentary vote to move the seat of federal government from Bonn to Berlin, the country's historic capital, Geißler proposed a two-city capital as a compromise.

From being a conservative right-winger until the early 1990s, he also became increasingly leftist in his views as far as social policy and globalization are concerned. In 2007, he announced he had become a member of the attac network. This happened weeks before the 2007 G8 summit, which Germany, holding the 2007 G8 presidency, was hosting. Geißler himself said that his joining of attac had to be seen in the context of the upcoming G8 summit.

Other activities 
 Aktion Courage, Chairman (2002–2005)
 Barmenia Versicherungen, Member of the Advisory Board

Personal life 

Geißler was married and had three children. Since 1980 he lived in Gleisweiler. He died on 11 September 2017, aged 87.

References

External links 

1930 births
2017 deaths
People from Oberndorf am Neckar
Christian Democratic Union of Germany politicians
Members of the Bundestag for Rhineland-Palatinate
Members of the Bundestag 1998–2002
Members of the Bundestag 1994–1998
Members of the Bundestag 1990–1994
Members of the Bundestag 1987–1990
Members of the Bundestag 1983–1987
Members of the Bundestag 1980–1983
Members of the Bundestag 1969–1972
Members of the Bundestag 1965–1969
People from the Free People's State of Württemberg
University of Tübingen alumni
Jurists from Baden-Württemberg
Health ministers of Germany
Federal government ministers of Germany
Ministers for children, young people and families
State ministers of Rhineland-Palatinate
Commanders Crosses of the Order of Merit of the Federal Republic of Germany
Recipients of the Order of Merit of Baden-Württemberg